Pristimantis palmeri is a species of frog in the family Strabomantidae.
It is endemic to Colombia.
Its natural habitats are tropical moist montane forests, rural gardens, and heavily degraded former forest.
It is threatened by habitat loss.

References

palmeri
Endemic fauna of Colombia
Amphibians of Colombia
Amphibians described in 1912
Taxonomy articles created by Polbot